Giovanni Moro (born 29 August 1967) is an Italian former alpine skier.

World Cup results
Top 10

References

External links
 

1967 births
Living people
Italian male alpine skiers